Flyman may refer to:
 Flyman (theater), one who manipulates curtains and scenery
 A man who drives a fly
 The Fly (Red Circle Comics), a fictional character
 Pseudonym for the founder of the Russian Business Network
 FlyMan : Empyrean, a stickman game on Facebook